Actenobius is a genus of beetles in the family Ptinidae. It contains two species, one extinct, Actenobius magneoculus, and one extant species, Actenobius pleuralis.

A fossil of Actenobius magneoculus was discovered in Spain in 2015. Actenobius pleuralis was described by T.L. Casey in 1898.

Genera
These two species belong to the genus Actenobius:
 Actenobius pleuralis (Casey, 1898)
 Actenobius magneoculus Peris & al., 2015

References

Ptinidae
Monotypic Bostrichiformia genera